54 Squadron or 54th Squadron may refer to:

 No. 54 Squadron RAF, United Kingdom
 54th Aero Squadron, Air Service, United States Army, see list of American aero squadrons
 54th Air Refueling Squadron, United States Air Force
 54th Helicopter Squadron, United States Air Force
 54th Fighter Squadron, United States Air Force
 54th Weather Reconnaissance Squadron, United States Air Force
 VA-54 (U.S. Navy)
 Second VA-54 (U.S. Navy)
 VPB-54, United States Navy
 VR-54, United States Navy

See also
 Jagdgeschwader 54